is a Japanese fantasy light novel series written by Sōichirō Hatano and illustrated by Shirabi. An anime adaptation by Kyoto Animation aired from January to March 2016.

Plot
In the near future, the accidental release of an experimental virus causes an outbreak that changes the brain chemistry of every person in the world, allowing them to perceive extra-dimensional beings called "Phantoms". In addition, some children born after the outbreak have developed special powers that allow them to battle and seal Phantoms. Even though the vast majority of phantoms are harmless, many of these gifted children are placed in clubs, schools, and organizations dedicated to dealing with Phantoms that prove to be nuisances or threats to humanity. The story revolves around Haruhiko Ichijo and his friends in the Phantom-hunting Club of Hosea Academy, a private school for children with special abilities to seal Phantoms, and their everyday life and struggles, dealing with Phantoms.

Characters

A first-year high school student and the main character. His special ability is called The Book of Thoth, which consists of sealing or summoning Phantoms by drawing them in a sketchbook. Due to the library in his house, he has a lot of knowledge about numerous different subjects, but many times his facts are seen as useless by his teammates. His parents are separated but he hopes for them to be reunited as a family again. In the anime, most of the episodes begin with Haruhiko giving a brief explanation about certain topics.

 A second-year high school student, Haruhiko's senior and original partner. She specializes in close combat. Her special ability is called Spirit of the Five Elements, which consists of channeling elemental powers through her body, such as fire from her heart, earth from her spleen, metal from her lungs, water from her kidneys, and wood from her armpit. Mai has been known by Haruhiko to be hot-headed and violent ever since she was a child. She seems to harbor feelings for Haruhiko.

 A first-year high school student and a new member of Haruhiko's team. Her special ability is called Phantom Eater, an unusual power that allows her to seal Phantoms by consuming them. She has also been trained in basic self-defense, as seen when she assaults Haruhiko when he touches her. She has a large appetite and constantly struggles with getting enough money to eat, despite coming from a wealthy household. She has an older sister who ran away from home due to their parents being very strict as well as having a strong dislike towards Phantoms. She strongly admires Mai who she claims to resemble her older sister. She later develops feelings for Haruhiko.

A newly transferred student who is always wearing headphones. Her special ability is a powerful sound attack using her voice, which can stun or seal Phantoms. This first manifested when she was in elementary school when a Phantom attacked the rabbits that she was assigned to care for in the schoolyard. She managed to seal the Phantom with her special ability, but in the process damaged a large portion of the school. This caused her friends and even her parents to fear her and she eventually developed the anti-social personality that she has today. She tends to use a lot of sugar in her drinks. She is hinted to have feelings for Haruhiko.

 A friendly Phantom in the form of a small fairy. She always follows Haruhiko and enjoys making fun of him and the other characters. This character is original to the anime. Her full name is Rururaruri Rurararirararururirirari Rirararururararururararirari.

 An anime-original character, she is a shy fourth-grade student from the primary school division of Hosea Academy who looks up to Haruhiko's group. She always carries a teddy bear named Albrecht (named after Albert the Bear) and has a very strong affinity with bears as almost everything associated with her has "bear" ("kuma") in its name, including the animal itself, her birthplace (Kumamoto Prefecture), her favorite food (bear claw) and even her surname (Kumamakura). Her special ability enlarges Albrecht's size considerably and allows him to move on his own and fight. Like Koito, Kurumi's ability manifested at a very young age. She's quite fond of Haruhiko.

Haruhiko's friend and classmate who is usually envious of him because all of his teammates are beautiful girls.

Haruhiko's teacher, who's responsible for assigning jobs to students with powers in order to deal with troublesome Phantoms in exchange for a reward.

Media

Novel
The light novel was written by Sōichirō Hatano and illustrated by Shirabi. It was published by Kyoto Animation's novel imprint KA Esuma Bunko on 20 December 2013. The book received an honorable mention in the novel category of the fourth Kyoto Animation Award on 5 April 2013. Previous works to be featured in the awards have received anime adaptations. A second novel was released on 30 October 2015. A third novel was released on 11 February 2016.

Anime
An anime television series aired between 7 January and 31 March 2016 on ABC Asahi, Tokyo MX, TV Aichi, and BS11. The series was directed by Tatsuya Ishihara and written by Fumihiko Shimo, with animation produced by Kyoto Animation. Kazumi Ikeda handled the series' character designs, and also served as the chief animation director. Shinpei Sawa provided the designs for the Phantoms. The series' music was composed by Effy. Additionally, Ryuuta Nakagami served as director of photography; Mikiko Watanabe was the series' art director; Kana Miyata provided the color key; Hiroshi Karata was in charge of accessories planning; and Yota Tsuruoka was the sound director. The anime was released on seven Blu-ray and DVD compilation volumes containing two episodes and one picture drama each between 6 April and 5 October 2016. An original video animation was bundled with the seventh volume. Funimation released the series in North America on home video, and Madman Entertainment distributes the title in Australia and New Zealand on behalf of Funimation.

Episode list

Notes

References

External links
 
 at Kyoto Animation 

2010s fantasy novels
2013 Japanese novels
Bandai Namco franchises
Crunchyroll anime
Funimation
Japanese fantasy novels
Kyoto Animation
KA Esuma Bunko